Salvia canescens, the hoary sage, is a herbaceous perennial that is endemic to the Caucasus mountains. The specific epithet, canescens, refers to the off-white hairs covering the leaves.

Salvia canescens was first described in 1831 by the Russian botanist Carl Anton von Meyer. The English botanist George Bentham applied the same name to a different species, which he corrected in his 1833 volume of Labiatarum Genera et Species by applying S. canescens Benth. as a synonym of Salvia pallida. In 1992, the Russian botanist Y. L. Menitsky reduced the species Salvia daghestanica, originally described in 1951 by Dmitrii Ivanovich Sosnowsky, to a variety of S. canescens, thus also requiring the autonym S. canescens var. canescens.

References

External links

canescens
Plants described in 1831